The American rock band Blink-182 has recorded songs for seven studio albums, as well as numerous extended plays. This list comprises the band's recorded catalog, as well as live renditions, early demo tracks, recorded appearances on other albums, and one unreleased track. Blink-182 formed in Poway, a suburb of San Diego, California in 1992. The trio consists of bassist and vocalist Mark Hoppus, drummer Travis Barker, and guitarist and vocalist Tom DeLonge. The band is considered a key group in the development of pop punk music; their combination of pop melodies with fast-paced punk rock featured a more radio-friendly accessibility than prior bands. The group, with original drummer Scott Raynor, emerged from the Southern California punk scene of the early 1990s and first gained notoriety for high-energy live shows and irreverent lyrical toilet humor.

The band were initially known as Blink until an Irish techno band threatened legal action; they appended "-182" randomly. However, the band proceeded to make up many reasons for the number, such as the number of times Al Pacino said the word 'fuck' in the 1983 film Scarface, Mark Hoppus' goal weight, and others. Cheshire Cat (1995) led the band to tour with Pennywise and NOFX on the Warped Tour. Dude Ranch (1997) was co-distributed by major label MCA Records and featured their first rock radio hit, "Dammit". Raynor was fired midway through a 1998 tour and replaced by Barker. Enema of the State (1999) was an enormous success on the strength of hit singles "What's My Age Again?" and "All the Small Things", which became airplay and MTV staples. Take Off Your Pants and Jacket (2001) reached number 1 in the United States, Canada, and Germany. The eponymously titled Blink-182 followed in 2003 and marked a stylistic shift for the group, infusing experimental elements into their usual pop punk formula, resulting in a more mature sound. DeLonge left the group in 2005, sending the band into what was termed an "indefinite hiatus."

The trio reunited in 2009 and their sixth studio album, Neighborhoods, consisting of their characteristic sound and the band member's different music tastes, was released in 2011 through Interscope to modest success and generally positive reviews, reaching number two on the Billboard 200. The band departed Interscope the next year. In November 2012, the group would record the Dogs Eating Dogs EP, released independently a month after. Tension would grew between the trio as new material was planned to be recorded but due to DeLonge's side projects kept delaying dates, he would quit the band afterwards. Hoppus and Barker recruited Alkaline Trio frontman Matt Skiba to fill in for DeLonge to perform two club shows and a slot at the Musink Tattoo Convention & Music Festival in March 2015. After legal battles with DeLonge were worked out, Skiba, who returned to Alkaline Trio for a string of dates and the release of his side project the Sekrets, rejoined Blink-182 as an official member. Between January and March 2016, the new line-up consisting of Hoppus, Barker and Skiba recorded California, produced by John Feldmann for its release in July on independent service BMG to mixed to positive reviews. The album included, for a first time, outside songwriters, the likes of Patrick Stump of Fall Out Boy. It also marked their second number-one album in over 15 years, thus becoming their first to top the charts in the United Kingdom and receiving a Grammy nomination for the Best Rock Album award. After touring in support of the album, recording process began developing for the following record.

The trio moved to major label Columbia for the eight album Nine, released on September 20, 2019 to generally positive reviews, who complimented the band's upgrade signature sound, as well as its moody lyrical content. Produced by Feldmann, also utilizing outside producers/songwriters including Captain Cuts, the Futuristics, and Tim Pagnotta. It debuted at number three on the Billboard 200 domestically and reached top ten in Canada, Austria, Germany and the United Kingdom. In October 2022, DeLonge returned to the band after almost eight years with a new single, "Edging", on October 14, 2022 and an album at a future date. Blink-182 has sold over 50 million albums worldwide.

Songs

As lead artist

As featured artist

See also
Blink-182 discography

Notes

References

External links
 
 

 
Blink-182